La Pared de los Moros (English: The Moors’ Wall) was a Roman gravity dam in Teruel province, Aragon, Spain, dating to the 3rd century AD.

See also 
 List of Roman dams and reservoirs
 Roman architecture
 Roman engineering

Notes

References 
 

Roman dams in Spain
Gravity dams
Province of Teruel